This My Way is a mini-album of the Japanese hard rock band Show-Ya. The album was released on 2 February 1998 in Japan and had limited distribution. It is Show-Ya's only recording with singer Yoshino.

Track listing
"Blowin' You Tonight" (Miki Nakamura) – 3:53
"Let It Go" (Nakamura) – 5:15
"This My Way" (Nakamura, Yoshino) – 5:31
"Crazy Eyes" (Satomi Senba, Miki Tsunoda, Yoshino) – 4:00
"How Come...?" (Senba, Tsunoda) – 4:20
"Sunshine" (Nakamura) – 6:15

Personnel

Band members
Yoshino – vocals
Miki Igarashi – guitars
Miki Nakamura – keyboards
Satomi Senba – bass
Miki Tsunoda – drums

References

External links
"This My Way" video clip

Show-Ya albums
1998 EPs
Japanese-language EPs